Gary Con is a gaming convention held in Lake Geneva, Wisconsin every year to celebrate the life and works of Gary Gygax. Gary Gygax is the co-creator of Dungeons & Dragons and commonly considered the father of role playing games. Gygax was raised in Lake Geneva and its where the company he founded, TSR, Inc. created and produced the Dungeons & Dragons game for 25 years.

History
When Dungeons & Dragons co-creator Gary Gygax died in 2008, role playing gamers from around the world joined to honor Gygax's life with a virtual convention, held at locations around the world. Gygax's friends and family held an impromptu game event at Lake Geneva's American Legion Hall following his funeral on March 8, 2008, now known as "Gary Con 0," By 2009, son Luke Gygax had established the first official Gary Con, still at the Legion Hall. "Gary Con I," held March 7, 2009, was attended by a number of gaming industry icons: Frank Mentzer, Tom Wham, Steve Chenault, and Jim Ward. Daughter M. Elise Gygax-Cousino helped establish the initial event.

By 2010, the Legion Hall no longer had the capacity to host the growing event and its participants. As a result, the event was moved to a local lodge west of the town. The convention moved to the Grand Geneva Resort and Spa in 2016, where attendance has doubled since then. Convention organizer Luke Gygax told a local paper Gary Con was "...meant to be a more intimate event, reminiscent of the formative years of the gaming industry."

Gary Con was mentioned in the February 26, 2015 episode of the television sitcom The Big Bang Theory, "The Intimacy Acceleration." This reference brought attention to the event, causing its website to nearly crash, and boosting attendance for that year.

Events
The focus of Gary Con is "Old School Renaissance", with games written during Gygax's ownership of TSR getting the most attention. Often the games are run by designers who originally created the game: Metamorphosis Alpha run by Jim Ward, Fight in the Skies run by Mike Carr, and Tom Wham's boardgames.  Other TSR titles are in abundance and a host of loyal gamers running the classic games, such as Chainmail. HMGS Midwest is well represented at this event honoring Gygax, who was historical wargamer before founding TSR. Another favorite of the con, is Joe Kline's Circus Maximus qualifiers, as well as his modified games which include "Mobieus Maximus." Recent years has seen the addition of Last Hope Live Action Roleplay, a local LARPing group which attends the convention, trains convention goers in combat, and leads them on a live adventure in which they must face monsters and other opponents in battle, discover and return important items, and solve puzzles. In March 2022, Gary Con featured the public wedding of Satine Phoenix and Jamison Stone of Apotheosis Studios.

References

Conventions in Wisconsin
Gaming conventions
Lake Geneva, Wisconsin
Tourist attractions in Walworth County, Wisconsin